Degel HaTorah is an Ashkenazi Haredi political party in Israel. For much of its existence, it has been allied with Agudat Yisrael, under the name United Torah Judaism.

History 
Degel HaTorah was founded in 1988, as a splinter from Agudat Israel. Its establishment by Rabbi Elazar Shach was due to ongoing policy disputes with the Hasidic rabbis within Agudat Yisrael. In the 1988 elections, the party won two seats, taken by Avraham Ravitz and Moshe Gafni, and joined Yitzhak Shamir's coalition government. For the 1992 elections, the party allied itself with Agudat Yisrael, under the name United Torah Judaism.

Although the party split shortly before the 1996 elections, they re-united for the elections. This was repeated for the 1999, 2006, and 2009 elections.

Currently (2021), the party has three MKs (of the seven representing United Torah Judaism): Moshe Gafni, Ya'akov Asher, and Yitzhak Pindros.

Ideology 

Degel HaTorah represents the "Lithuanian wing" of the non-Hasidic Haredim (known as "Mitnagdim"), as opposed to the Hasidic-dominated Agudat Yisrael party. Sometimes, the parties compete against each other; at other times, they join forces within a political alliance called United Torah Judaism (UTJ) (Yahadut HaTorah in Hebrew).

In Jerusalem, it was based on a long-standing argument against a 1989 agreement between Degel HaTorah's then-spiritual leader Rabbi Elazar Shach, the venerated Rosh yeshiva of the famed Ponevezh Yeshiva in Bnei Brak, and the spiritual leader of Agudat Yisrael, the Pnei Menachem of Gur, Rabbi Pinchas Menachem Alter. The deal, based on the demographics of the time, stated that when UTJ would join forces, Aguda would receive 60% of the seats, and Degel 40%. This agreement was first contested in May 2016, when Degel's Knesset leader Moshe Gafni demanded that then-Deputy Education Minister Meir Porush resign from the Knesset, in order to give Degel 3 out of the 6 seats held by UTJ. Porush was able to keep his ministerial position under the 2015 so-called Norwegian Law. In 2018, Degel reached a 50-50 agreement with Aguda, with an Aguda representative as the Chairman of the party.

Degel HaTorah's rabbinical arbiter ("posek") was, until his death in 2012, centenarian Rabbi Yosef Shalom Eliashiv of Jerusalem. Rabbi Eliashiv served as one of two Chairmen of Degel HaTorah's Moetzes Gedolei HaTorah ("Council of Torah Sages"). After Rabbi Eliyashiv's death, Rabbi Aharon Yehuda Leib Shteinman led the party; after him, by Rabbi Chaim Kanievsky and yblo"ch Rabbi Gershon Edelstein.

See also
Hasidim and Mitnagdim
Agudat Yisrael

References

External links
Party history Knesset website
Dei'ah Vedibur, weekly web publication with material from Yated Neeman newspaper
" Krias Kodesh for the United Torah Judaism and Shabbos - Agudas Yisroel Degel HaTorah List Issued by Maranan Verabonon Gedolei Vetzadikei Hador Shlita, Parshas Vaykhel/Pekudei 5766

1988 establishments in Israel
Ashkenazi Jews topics
Haredi Judaism in Israel
Orthodox Jewish political parties
Political parties established in 1988
Political parties in Israel
Conservative parties in Israel
Social conservative parties
Rabai Shech